Bury is a commune in the Oise department in northern France.

Population

Notable people
 Alexandre Martin (27 April 1815 in Bury – 28 May 1895), nicknamed Albert l'ouvrier ("Albert the Worker"), was a socialist politician of the French Second Republic, the first member of the industrial working class to be in French government.

See also
 Communes of the Oise department

References

Communes of Oise